This is a list of notable events in country music that took place in the year 2002.

Events
 January 13 - CMT premieres CMT Crossroads, which features country music artists being paired with artists from other genres. The show has since become one of the channel's most successful programs; the first episode featured Lucinda Williams and Elvis Costello.
 May 27 - Toby Keith releases "Courtesy of the Red, White and Blue (The Angry American)"; written in response to the death of Keith's father and the September 11, 2001 attacks, the song stirs up controversy for the line "We'll put a boot in your ass/It's the American way". Canadian-born newsman Peter Jennings and Dixie Chicks frontwoman Natalie Maines both express criticism of the song, with a feud with the latter lasting for a year.
 October 7 - Toby Keith begins airing in television spots as the spokesman for Ford, with his original composition, "Ford Truck Man", during that night's broadcast of Monday Night Football.
 November 19 – Shania Twain returned with her fourth album, Up!. It opened at No. 1 on the Billboard 200 chart with 874,000 copies; the album remained atop the chart until the new year.

The Statler Brothers retire from touring and singing together at their Farewell Concert in Salem, Virginia. Jimmy Fortune continued his career as a solo artist.

Top hits of the year
The following songs placed within the Top 20 on the Hot Country Songs charts in 2002:

Top new album releases
The following albums placed within the Top 50 on the Top Country Albums charts in 2002:

Other top albums

Deaths
February 13 – Waylon Jennings, 64, singer and guitarist (diabetic complications)
March 3 – Harlan Howard, 74, songwriter
May 26 – Orville Couch, 67, singer-songwriter (acute lymphoblastic leukemia)

Hall of Fame inductees

Bluegrass Music Hall of Fame inductees
The Lilly Brothers & Don Stover
David Freeman

Country Music Hall of Fame inductees
Bill Carlisle (1908–2003)
Porter Wagoner (1927–2007)

Canadian Country Music Hall of Fame inductees
Anne Murray
Art Snider
Bev Munro
D'Arcy Scott
Elmer Tippe

Major awards

ARIA Awards
Best Country Album – Barricades & Brickwalls (Kasey Chambers)
ARIA Hall of Fame – Olivia Newton-John

Grammy Awards
Best Female Country Vocal Performance – "Cry" (Faith Hill)
Best Male Country Vocal Performance – "Give My Love to Rose" (Johnny Cash)
Best Country Performance by a Duo or Group with Vocal – "Long Time Gone" (Dixie Chicks)
Best Country Collaboration with Vocals – "Mendocino County Line" (Willie Nelson featuring Lee Ann Womack)
Best Country Instrumental Performance – "Lil' Jack Slade" (Dixie Chicks)
Best Country Song – "Where Were You (When the World Stopped Turning)" (Alan Jackson)
Best Country Album – Home (Dixie Chicks)
Best Bluegrass Album – Lost in the Lonesome Pines (Jim Lauderdale, Ralph Stanley & the Clinch Mountain Boys)

Juno Awards
Country Recording of the Year – "I'm Gonna Getcha Good!", Shania Twain

CMT Flameworthy Video Music Awards
Video of the Year – "Young", Kenny Chesney
Male Video of the Year – "Young", Kenny Chesney
Female Video of the Year – "Blessed", Martina McBride
Group / Duo Video of the Year – "Only in America", Brooks & Dunn
Breakthrough Video of the Year – "I Breathe In, I Breathe Out", Chris Cagle
Video Collaboration of the Year – "Mendocino County Line", Willie Nelson Featuring Lee Ann Womack
Hottest Video of the Year – "The Cowboy in Me", Tim McGraw
Concept Video of the Year – "I'm Gonna Miss Her (The Fishin' Song)", Brad Paisley
Fashion Plate Video of the Year – "Jezebel", Chely Wright
"LOL" (Laugh Out Loud) Video of the Year – "I Wanna Talk About Me", Toby Keith
Love Your Country Video of the Year – "Where Were You (When the World Stopped Turning)", Alan Jackson
Video Director of the Year – "I Wanna Talk About Me", Toby Keith (Director: Michael Salomon)
Video Visionary Award – Dixie Chicks

Americana Music Honors & Awards 
Album of the Year – Buddy & Julie Miller
Artist of the Year – Jim Lauderdale
Song of the Year – "She's Looking At Me" (Jim Lauderdale)
Instrumentalist of the Year – Jerry Douglas
Spirit of Americana/Free Speech Award – Johnny Cash
Lifetime Achievement: Songwriting – Billie Joe Shaver
Lifetime Achievement: Performance – Emmylou Harris
Lifetime Achievement: Executive – T Bone Burnett

Academy of Country Music
Entertainer of the Year – Toby Keith
Song of the Year – "I'm Movin' On", Rascal Flatts
Single of the Year – "The Good Stuff," Kenny Chesney
Album of the Year – Drive, Alan Jackson
Top Male Vocalist – Kenny Chesney
Top Female Vocalist – Martina McBride
Top Vocal Duo – Brooks & Dunn
Top Vocal Group – Rascal Flatts
Top New Male Vocalist – Joe Nichols
Top New Female Vocalist – Kellie Coffey
Top New Vocal Duo or Group – Emerson Drive
Video of the Year – "Drive (For Daddy Gene)", Alan Jackson (Director: Steven Goldmann)
Vocal Event of the Year – "Mendocino County Line", Willie Nelson and Lee Ann Womack

Canadian Country Music Association
Fans' Choice Award – Terri Clark
Male Artist of the Year – Paul Brandt
Female Artist of the Year – Carolyn Dawn Johnson
Group or Duo of the Year – Emerson Drive
SOCAN Song of the Year – "Ten Million Teardrops", Jason McCoy, Tim Taylor
Single of the Year – "I Don't Want You to Go", Carolyn Dawn Johnson
Album of the Year – Small Towns and Big Dreams, Paul Brandt
Top Selling Album – Scarecrow, Garth Brooks
CMT Video of the Year – "I Don't Want You to Go", Carolyn Dawn Johnson
Chevy Trucks Rising Star Award – Emerson Drive
Roots Artist or Group of the Year – Jimmy Rankin

Country Music Association
Entertainer of the Year – Alan Jackson
Song of the Year – "Where Were You (When the World Stopped Turning)," Alan Jackson
Single of the Year – "Where Were You (When the World Stopped Turning)," Alan Jackson
Album of the Year – Drive, Alan Jackson
Male Vocalist of the Year – Alan Jackson
Female Vocalist of the Year – Martina McBride
Vocal Duo of the Year – Brooks & Dunn
Vocal Group of the Year – Dixie Chicks
Musician of the Year – Jerry Douglas
Horizon Award – Rascal Flatts
Music Video of the Year – "I'm Gonna Miss Her (The Fishin' Song)," Brad Paisley (Director: Peter Zavadil)
Vocal Event of the Year – "Mendocino County Line", Willie Nelson and Lee Ann Womack
Musician of the Year – Jerry Douglas

Further reading
Whitburn, Joel, "Top Country Songs 1944–2005 – 6th Edition." 2005.

Other links
Country Music Association
Inductees of the Country Music Hall of Fame

External links
Country Music Hall of Fame

Country
Country music by year